The 12th constituency of the Gironde (French: Douzième circonscription de la Gironde) is a French legislative constituency in the Gironde département. Like the other 576 French constituencies, it elects one MP using the two-round system, with a run-off if no candidate receives over 50% of the vote in the first round.

Description

The 12th constituency of the Gironde lies in the east of the department. It was created as a result of the 2010 redistricting of French legislative constituencies which awarded an additional seat to Gironde. The seat was initially held by Martine Faure of the Socialist Party who had previously represented Gironde's 9th constituency. She was, however, defeated in the En Marche! landslide in 2017 along with all but one of her Socialist Party colleagues in Gironde.

Assembly Members

Election Results

2022

 
 
 
 
 
 
 
 
|-
| colspan="8" bgcolor="#E9E9E9"|
|-
 
 

 
 
 
 
 

* PS dissident

2017

2012

References

12